Puerto Rico Highway 193 (PR-193) is a road located in Luquillo, Puerto Rico, passing through its downtown. This highway begins at PR-3 southeast of downtown Luquillo and returns again to PR-3 near Playa Fortuna.

Major intersections

See also

 List of highways numbered 193

References

External links
 

193
Luquillo, Puerto Rico